With Love, Chér is the fourth studio album by American singer-actress Cher, released on November 1967 by Imperial Records. The album was a moderate commercial success and reached number 47 on the US Billboard 200

Album information 
With Love, Chér was released in 1967, was produced by Sonny Bono and was issued by the Liberty Records subsidiary, Imperial Records.

Once again the formula of cover songs and a new song written by Bono exclusively for Cher is used. On these tracks her voice is smooth and strong, but the sales failed to match the success of previous albums.

Four singles were released from the album: the cover "Behind The Door" and "Hey Joe" and two songs written by Bono, "Mama (When My Dollies Have Babies)" and her last big hit of the decade "You Better Sit Down Kids".

The album contains covers of "The Times They Are A-Changin", "Hey Joe" and "I Will Wait for You" (the soundtrack of The Umbrellas of Cherbourg).

In this same year Cher recorded "Bambini Miei Cari (Sedetevi Attorno)", the Italian version of "You Better Sit Down Kids", and "Mama", the Italian version of "Mama (When My Dollies Have Babies)". Both were released as singles and "Mama" was later covered by French singer Dalida.

In 2005, this album and Cher's previous album Chér were reissued on one CD called Chér/With Love which featured all the tracks from both.

Track listing

Personnel
Cher - lead vocals

Production
Sonny Bono - record producer
Stan Ross - sound engineer

Design
Sonny Bono - photography
Woody Woodward - art direction

Charts

References

External links
Official Cher site
Imperial Records Official Site

1967 albums
Cher albums
Liberty Records albums
Imperial Records albums
Albums arranged by Harold Battiste
Albums produced by Sonny Bono
Albums recorded at Gold Star Studios